Volha Alyaksandrauna Sudarava, née Siarheyenka, (née , born 22 June 1984) is a Belarusian athlete. She won the silver medal in long jump at the 2012 European Championships in Helsinki, with a result of 6.74 metres.

Her personal bests in the event are 6.86 metres outdoors (+0.6 m/s, Cheboksary 2015) and 6.73 metres indoors (Gomel 2012).

Competition record

External links 

 

1984 births
Living people
Belarusian female long jumpers
Athletes (track and field) at the 2008 Summer Olympics
Athletes (track and field) at the 2012 Summer Olympics
Athletes (track and field) at the 2016 Summer Olympics
Olympic athletes of Belarus
European Athletics Championships medalists
World Athletics Championships athletes for Belarus
Sportspeople from Gomel
Competitors at the 2007 Summer Universiade